The Aghaward fort  is a ringfort (rath) and National Monument located in County Longford, Ireland.

Location
There are several springs nearby, and various tributaries of the River Camlin.

Description
The ringfort is an enclosure with a high earthen bank and external ditch, the bank rising up  from the base of the ditch.

References

Archaeological sites in County Longford
National Monuments in County Longford